Horace Robinson Kornegay (March 12, 1924 – January 21, 2009) was a U.S. Representative from North Carolina.

Born in Asheville, North Carolina, Kornegay was educated in the public schools of Greensboro, North Carolina, graduating from Greensboro Senior High School (see Grimsley High School) in 1941.
He attended Georgia School of Technology and graduated from Wake Forest College with a B.S., 1947, and an LL.B., 1949.
He was admitted to the bar and entered the practice of law in Greensboro in 1949.
He served in the United States Army in Company D, 397th Infantry Regiment, 100th Infantry Division from December 14, 1942, to February 1, 1946, with service in the European theatre of World War II and became a priviate first class. He served as assistant district solicitor from 1951 to 1953.

Kornegay was elected district solicitor (prosecuting attorney), for the twelfth district of North Carolina in 1954 and again in 1958. He served as a delegate to the 1964 Democratic National Convention.

Kornegay was elected as a Democrat to the Eighty-seventh and to the three succeeding Congresses (January 3, 1961 – January 3, 1969).
He was not a candidate for reelection in 1968 to the Ninety-first Congress.
He served as vice president and counsel (January 1969-June 1970), then president (June 1970-February 1981), and finally chairman (February 1982-December 1986), of the Tobacco Institute, Inc.
He resumed the practice of law in Greensboro, North Carolina, in January 1987.
He lived in Greensboro until his death in 2009, aged 84.

Sources

External links
Oral History Interview with Horace Kornegay at Oral Histories of the American South
News & Observer: Horace Kornegay, tobacco advocate, dies
Greensboro News & Record: Former Greensboro congressman dies

1924 births
2009 deaths
Wake Forest University alumni
Democratic Party members of the United States House of Representatives from North Carolina
20th-century American politicians
United States Army personnel of World War II
United States Army soldiers
Politicians from Asheville, North Carolina
Grimsley High School alumni
Politicians from Greensboro, North Carolina